Abhishek Verma (born 23 February 1968 in New Delhi, India) is a billionaire arms dealer globally known as the 'Lord of War' and was the main suspect in the Scorpene Submarines deal scandal but was exonerated by Indian Courts in 2015.

Personal life

Verma's father, Shrikant Verma, was a leading journalist before Indira Gandhi brought him into the Indian National Congress party (INC) and made him a member of the 1976 Indian Parliament. From an early age, he was exposed to the media in his public life due to the assistance he provided his father. His mother, Veena Verma, served for fourteen years as a Member of Parliament, and was Vice-President of the INC, responsible for the Mahila Congress.

In 2001, Verma was engaged to marry Evelina Papantoniou, a former Miss Greece and runner-up in the Miss Universe competition. He was also dating Playboy center-fold Simone Cronstrand prior to marrying Anca Neacsu former Miss Romania.

Career
Verma was Chairman of Atlas Interactive India Private Limited and signed an agreement with the  Indian Government to run Bharat Sanchar Nigam Limited to provide the technology for 'netTV' (television through an internet connection) by 2004.  In 2011 Verma took over the reins of Olialia World a multinational FMCG brand as the Chief Evangelist of the group. In 2017 Verma was awarded the contract to construct & own Maldives International airport with an investment of US$500 million, which would be known as Olialia International Airport for 50 years.

In May 2019 a controversy erupted in Maldives when photos of Billionaire Verma were published with President Mohammed Nasheed who is the Chairman of MDP Party in Maldives. Verma threatened to sue the columnist Bushry associated with the newspaper One Online causing uproar in Maldives.

Verma is the main witness in 1984 anti-Sikh riots against Congress leader Jagdish Tytler. The courts in December 2015 directed the Central Bureau of Investigation (CBI) to record Verma's testimony as witness. Due to the high threat perception, Verma was granted round the clock 'Z' category Delhi Police protection and paramilitary forces on the directions of Delhi High Court.

Verma's proximity to Varun Gandhi, scion of the Nehru–Gandhi family, was made public when explicit photos of Gandhi and Verma with European escorts were released to the news media in 2016 by social activist politician Prashant Bhushan. Gandhi and Verma denied the allegations and issued statements that the photos released by Bhushan were morphed. Bhushan's allegations of Gandhi being blackmailed by Verma were also rubbished by Gandhi.

Verma was nominated to contest Lok Sabha parliamentary elections from Congress Party in 1996, which he turned down due to personal reasons.

Allegations of corruption and imprisonment
In 2006, Verma was accused by the opposition Bharatiya Janata Party (BJP) of receiving kickbacks amounting to around US$200 million, through a US$4.5 billion Indian military deal, as a consequence of the Indian government purchasing six Scorpène-class submarines from Thales. The BJP raised this in Parliament, pointing out his proximity to the Congress party, and alleged he had gained the agency to negotiate the contract with Thales as a result of bribing certain Congress politicians.

Verma and Thales immediately denied all the allegations, and launched a lawsuit against The Outlook Magazine, which had been the first to break the story. He also sued the former BJP Deputy Prime Minister of India, L. K. Advani, for criminal defamation; Advani had campaigned against Verma, demanding the Government charge the latter with corruption.

In 2015 the Delhi High Court exonerated Verma when the CBI published their report into the allegations: they stated that the monies received by him was not a result of the submarine sale. On 7 June 2012, CBI raided Verma's 10 premises and establishments in India after registration of cases of corruption and money laundering.

In 2013, Verma was named a suspect in the 2013 Indian helicopter bribery scandal by the Indian Government for massive bribes exceeding Euros 50 million that were paid to Indian politicians including Sonia Gandhi as alleged by BJP leader Subramanian Swamy. Verma is suspected to have been the middleman in the chopper deal and the nexus was exposed by TimesNow TV with their global investigation however he was acquitted by the Indian Courts in April 2017.

Due to various other arms deal-related cases that Verma and his wife are alleged to have been involved in, the government attempted to freeze their secret bank accounts in Liechtenstein, which are said to hold over US$500 million; however the Liechtenstein authorities rejected the Indian government's request to open the accounts in 2015.

When Enforcement Directorate raids were carried out at Verma's residences, among the goods seized were 36 paintings, valued at over US$5 million and designer watches worth US$1 million.

In June 2012, Verma was arrested and charged with corruption and money laundering; the trial commenced in December 2015. In April 2017, a CBI special court exonerated Verma and his wife from all the allegations and charges and gave them a clean chit.

References

1968 births
Indian National Congress politicians from Delhi
Living people
People from New Delhi
Indian socialites
Businesspeople from Delhi
Arms traders